Yvan Waddell (born 15 January 1964) is a Canadian former cyclist. He competed at the 1988 Summer Olympics and the 1992 Summer Olympics.

References

External links
 

1964 births
Living people
Canadian male cyclists
Olympic cyclists of Canada
Cyclists at the 1988 Summer Olympics
Cyclists at the 1992 Summer Olympics
People from the National Capital District (Papua New Guinea)